Denbigh District of Boroughs (variously referred to as Denbigh District, Denbigh Boroughs or just Denbigh) was a parliamentary constituency centred on the town of Denbigh in Wales.  It returned one Member of Parliament (MP) to the British House of Commons.

The constituency first returned an MP in 1542, to the English Parliament.  From 1707 to 1800, the MPs sat in the Parliament of Great Britain, and after the Act of Union 1800, in the Parliament of the United Kingdom.

The constituency was abolished for the 1918 general election.

Boundaries
From its first known general election in 1542 until 1918, the constituency consisted of a number of boroughs within the historic county of Denbighshire in Wales.

The seat should not be confused with the county constituency of Denbighshire, which existed from the sixteenth century until 1885. The county was divided into East Denbighshire and West Denbighshire between 1885 and 1918.

After 1918 Denbighshire was represented in Parliament by two single member county constituencies, which included all the boroughs formerly in the Denbigh District of Boroughs. One of these was Wrexham, but the other was the Denbigh' division of Denbighshire.

Denbigh (1535–1832)
On the basis of information from several volumes of the History of Parliament, it is apparent that the history of the borough representation from Wales and Monmouthshire is more complicated than that of the English boroughs.

The Laws in Wales Act 1535 (26 Hen. VIII, c. 26) provided for a single borough seat for each of 11 of the 12 Welsh counties and Monmouthshire. The legislation was ambiguous as to which communities were enfranchised. The county towns were awarded a seat, but this in some fashion represented all the ancient boroughs of the county as the others were required to contribute to the members wages. It was not clear if the burgesses of the contributing boroughs could take part in the election. The only election under the original scheme was for the 1542 Parliament. It seems that only burgesses from the county towns actually took part. An Act of 1544 (35 Hen. VIII, c. 11) confirmed that the contributing boroughs could send representatives to take part in the election at the county town. As far as can be told from surviving indentures of returns, the degree to which the out boroughs participated varied, but by the end of the sixteenth century all the seats had some participation from them at some elections at least.

The original scheme was modified by later legislation and decisions of the House of Commons (which were sometimes made with no regard to precedent or evidence: for example in 1728 it was decided that only the freemen of the borough of Montgomery could participate in the election for that seat, thus disenfranchising the freemen of Llanidloes, Welshpool and Llanfyllin).

In the case of Denbighshire, the county town was Denbigh. The out boroughs were Chirk, Holt, and Ruthin. At some point, between 1603 and 1690, Chirk ceased to participate.

In 1690–1790 the freemen of the three remaining boroughs were entitled to vote. There were about 1,400 electors in 1715 (including non-resident freemen). This number was reduced to about 400 after 1744, when only resident freemen were allowed to vote. The electorate increased to about 500 in the 1754–1790 period.

Denbigh Boroughs (1832–1918)
This was a district of boroughs constituency, which grouped a number of parliamentary boroughs in Denbighshire into one single member constituency. The voters from each participating borough cast ballots, which were added together over the whole district to decide the result of the poll. The enfranchised communities in this district, from 1832, were the four boroughs of Denbigh, Holt, Ruthin, and Wrexham.

The exact boundaries of the parliamentary boroughs in the district were altered by the Parliamentary Boundaries Act 1868, but the general nature of the constituency was unchanged. There were no further boundary changes in the 1885 redistribution of parliamentary seats.

 After 1918
In the redistribution of seats which took place at the 1918, the Denbigh Boroughs constituency was abolished, along with the two county divisions of East Denbighshire and West Denbighshire. They were replaced by a new county division called Denbigh, which comprised the whole of the county, except for the Municipal Borough of Wrexham and part of the Chirk Rural District which formed the Wrexham division.

The local authorities in the Denbigh division were the Municipal Boroughs of Denbigh and Ruthin; the Urban Districts of Abergele and Pensarn, Colwyn Bay and Colwyn, Llangollen, and Llanrwst; as well as the Rural Districts of Llangollen, Llanrwst, Llansillin, Ruthin, St Asaph (Denbigh), Uwchaled, part of Chirk, and the part of Glan Conway not in Caernarvonshire.

Members of Parliament

MPs 1542–1660
As there were sometimes significant gaps between Parliaments held in this period, the dates of first assembly and dissolution are given. Where the name of the member has not yet been ascertained or is not recorded in a surviving document, the entry unknown is entered in the table.

MPs 1660–1918

Elections
Elections in the 1830s

Elections in the 1840s

Elections in the 1850s

Elections in the 1860s

Elections in the 1870s

 Elections in the 1880s 

 Elections in the 1890s 

 Elections in the 1900s 

 Elections in the 1910s 

A petition was lodged but was withdrawn after a recount. The original count gave the Conservatives 2,438 votes and the Lib-Lab candidate 2,430 votes.

See also
Denbigh (UK Parliament constituency) (from 1918)
Denbighshire (UK Parliament constituency) (abolished 1885)
East Denbighshire (UK Parliament constituency) (1885–1918)
West Denbighshire (UK Parliament constituency) (1885–1918)

References

 Boundaries of Parliamentary Constituencies 1885–1972, compiled and edited by F.W.S. Craig (Parliamentary Reference Publications 1972)
 British Parliamentary Election Results 1832–1885, compiled and edited by F.W.S. Craig (Macmillan Press 1977)
 British Parliamentary Election Results 1885–1918, compiled and edited by F.W.S. Craig (Macmillan Press 1974)
 The House of Commons 1509–1558, by S.T. Bindoff (Secker & Warburg 1982)
 The House of Commons 1558–1603, by P.W. Hasler (HMSO 1981)
 The House of Commons 1690–1715, by Eveline Cruickshanks, Stuart Handley and D.W. Hayton (Cambridge University Press 2002)
 The House of Commons 1715–1754, by Romney Sedgwick (HMSO 1970)
 The House of Commons 1754–1790, by Sir Lewis Namier and John Brooke (HMSO 1964)
 The Parliaments of England'' by Henry Stooks Smith (1st edition published in three volumes 1844–50), second edition edited (in one volume) by F.W.S. Craig (Political Reference Publications 1973)

Historic parliamentary constituencies in North Wales
History of Denbighshire
Constituencies of the Parliament of the United Kingdom established in 1542
Constituencies of the Parliament of the United Kingdom disestablished in 1918

pl:Okręg wyborczy Denbigh